In enzymology, an anthocyanin 3'-O-beta-glucosyltransferase is an enzyme that catalyzes the chemical reaction

UDP-glucose + an anthocyanin  UDP + an anthocyanin 3'-O-beta-D-glucoside

Thus, the two substrates of this enzyme are UDP-glucose and anthocyanin, whereas its two products are UDP and anthocyanin 3'-O-beta-D-glucoside.

This enzyme belongs to the family of glycosyltransferases, specifically the hexosyltransferases.  The systematic name of this enzyme class is UDP-glucose:anthocyanin 3'-O-beta-D-glucosyltransferase. Other names in common use include UDP-glucose:anthocyanin 3'-O-glucosyltransferase, and 3'GT.

References

 

EC 2.4.1
Enzymes of unknown structure